The following is a list of albums released by now-defunct record label Loud Records.

1990s

1992 
Twista (credited as Tung Twista) — Runnin' Off at da Mouth

1993 
The Alkaholiks — 21 & Over
Mad Kap — Look Ma Duke, No Hands
Wu-Tang Clan — Enter the Wu-Tang (36 Chambers)

1994 
Fresh (Music Inspired by the Film)
Loud '95 Nudder Butters

1995 
The Alkaholiks — Coast II Coast
Funkmaster Flex — The Mix Tape Volume 1 (60 Minutes of Funk)
Mobb Deep — The Infamous
Raekwon — Only Built 4 Cuban Linx...

1996 
All That: The Album (Nick)
Cella Dwellas — Realms 'n Reality
Delinquent Habits — Delinquent Habits
Mobb Deep — Hell on Earth
Off Da Hook — Off Da Hook
Sadat X — Wild Cowboys
Xzibit — At the Speed of Life

1997 
The Alkaholiks — Likwidation
Bring Da Ruckus/A Loud Story
Adriana Evans — Adriana Evans
Funkmaster Flex — The Mix Tape Volume II (60 Minutes of Funk)
Hoodlum (Music Inspired by the Motion Picture) (Interscope)
Yvette Michele — My Dream
Soul in the Hole (Relativity)
Wu-Tang Clan — Wu-Tang Forever

1998 
Big Pun — Capital Punishment (Terror Squad)
Davina — Best of Both Worlds
Delinquent Habits — Here Come the Horns
Funkmaster Flex — 60 Minutes of Funk (The Mixtape Volume III: The Final Chapter)
Pete Rock — Soul Survivor
Xzibit — 40 Dayz & 40 Nightz

1999 
The Beatnuts — A Musical Massacre (Relativity/Epic)
Inspectah Deck — Uncontrolled Substance (Relativity)
Mobb Deep — Murda Muzik
No Good — Lizard Lizard
Project Pat — Ghetty Green (Hypnotize Minds)
Raekwon — Immobilarity
Tash — Rap Life

2000s

2000 
Big Pun — Yeeeah Baby (Terror Squad)
dead prez — Let's Get Free
Funkmaster Flex — 60 Minutes of Funk, Volume IV: The Mixtape
L.V. — How Long
Loud Rocks
Louder Than Ever Volume 1
Luke — Luke's Freak Fest 2000 (Luke)
Hypnotize Camp Posse — Three 6 Mafia Presents: Hypnotize Camp Posse (Hypnotize Minds)
M.O.P. — Warriorz (Relativity)
Prodigy — H.N.I.C. (Violator/Relativity/Infamous)
Three 6 Mafia — When the Smoke Clears: Sixty 6, Sixty 1 (Hypnotize Minds)
Wu-Tang Clan — The W
Xzibit — Restless (Open Bar/SRC/Epic)

2001 
The Alkaholiks (credited as Tha Liks) — X.O. Experience
The Beatnuts — Take It or Squeeze It (Epic)
Big Pun — Endangered Species
DJ Red Alert — Presents... Beats, Rhymes & Battles Vol. 1
Gangsta Boo — Both Worlds *69 (Hypnotize Minds/RED)
Killarmy — Fear, Love & War (36/Relativity)
Mobb Deep — Infamy (Infamous)
Project Pat — Mista Don't Play: Everythangs Workin (Hypnotize Minds/RED)
Three 6 Mafia — Choices: The Album (Relativity/Hypnotize Minds)
Violator: The Album, V2.0 (Violator)
Wu-Tang Clan — Iron Flag

2002 
The Beatnuts — Classic Nuts Volume 1 (Epic)
The Early Daze
Lil' Flip — Undaground Legend (Sucka Free)
Project Pat — Layin' da Smack Down (Hypnotize Minds)
The X-Ecutioners — Built from Scratch
Xzibit — Man vs. Machine (Open Bar)

References 

Discographies of American record labels
Discography